The Blackpool Combat Club (BCC) is a professional wrestling stable performing in All Elite Wrestling (AEW). Its namesake derives from Blackpool, a seaside resort in Lancashire, England, where the group's creator and former manager William Regal began his career. The group was originally composed of Regal, Bryan Danielson, and Jon Moxley, who would later be joined by Wheeler Yuta and Claudio Castagnoli. Regal turned on Moxley and left the group in November 2022 when he left the promotion.

Background
Jon Moxley and Bryan Danielson had their first interaction in August 2010 when they challenged one another to a professional wrestling match at Heartland Wrestling Association's Road to Destiny event in Dragon Gate USA a month later. Danielson, who was employed by World Wrestling Entertainment (WWE) at the time after his return at SummerSlam and was referred to as Daniel Bryan, wrestled his match against Moxley. In 2011, Moxley signed with WWE as Dean Ambrose and wrestled in its development territory, Florida Championship Wrestling, which later became NXT. He later became a successful member of The Shield. Ambrose and Bryan wrestled various matches throughout the 2010s, and both men became successful world champions for WWE before reverting to their respective names after their departures from WWE in 2019 and 2021, respectively, with both men joining All Elite Wrestling (AEW). During that period, William Regal was also employed by WWE prior to the faction's establishment as a wrestler and general manager for NXT, having helped train and teach both men.

History

On the February 2, 2022, episode of AEW Dynamite, Danielson offered Moxley to team up together, which Moxley accepted on the condition that they wrestled each other first. Danielson was defeated by Moxley at Revolution on March 6, after which the two began brawling. William Regal, once a mentor to both men, then made his AEW surprise debut to break up the fight and force them to shake hands. The two formed a team with Regal acting as their manager, later being named the Blackpool Combat Club.

On the April 8 episode of AEW Rampage, Moxley wrestled ROH Pure Champion Wheeler Yuta in a critically acclaimed match, in which Moxley ultimately emerged victorious. After the match, Regal offered Yuta a handshake, and subsequently invited him to join the group, which Yuta accepted. On the May 11 episode of Dynamite, Eddie Kingston and Santana and Ortiz united with the Blackpool Combat Club to fight off the Jericho Appreciation Society (Chris Jericho, Jake Hager, Daniel Garcia, Angelo Parker, and Matt Menard). At Double or Nothing on May 29, Blackpool Combat Club teamed with Eddie Kingston, Santana, and Ortiz to face the Jericho Appreciation Society in an Anarchy in the Arena match, but lost.

At AEW x NJPW: Forbidden Door on June 26, Yuta teamed up with Kingston and Shota Umino in a losing effort against Chris Jericho, Sammy Guevara, and Minoru Suzuki. Later that night, Claudio Castagnoli joined the Blackpool Combat Club and made his surprise AEW debut as Danielson's handpicked replacement due to the latter suffering an injury, defeating Zack Sabre Jr., while Moxley defeated Hiroshi Tanahashi to win the interim AEW World Championship in the main event. The Blackpool Combat Club would then team up again with Kingston, Santana, and Ortiz and avenge their loss to the Jericho Appreciation Society in a Blood and Guts match at the eponymous event. At Death Before Dishonor on July 23, Castagnoli defeated Jonathan Gresham to capture the ROH World Championship, while Yuta successfully defended the ROH Pure Championship against Daniel Garcia.

On the August 24 episode of Dynamite, Moxley quickly defeated lineal AEW World Champion CM Punk to win his record-setting second AEW World Championship, becoming the undisputed AEW World Champion in the process. Danielson was defeated by Jericho at All Out on September 4, while Moxley lost the undisputed championship to Punk, ending his reign at eleven days. On the following episode of Dynamite, Yuta lost the ROH Pure Championship to Daniel Garcia, thus ending his reign at 159 days. Moxley and Danielson were inserted in the AEW Grand Slam Tournament of Champions to crown a new AEW World Champion as previous champion CM Punk was stripped of the title. At Dynamite: Grand Slam on September 21, Castagnoli lost the ROH World Championship to Chris Jericho, while Moxley defeated Danielson in the tournament final to win the vacant championship, becoming the first ever three-time AEW World Champion.

At Full Gear, Moxley would lose the title to MJF after Regal gave MJF the Brass Knuckles, aligning himself with MJF. On the 30 November edition of Dynamite, MJF would turn on Regal. Following this, it was reported that Regal was set to leave AEW. His final appearance was a pre-taped segment aired on the 7 December edition of Dynamite.

On the March 8 2023 episode of Dynamite, Danielson announced he will be going home with his family after his loss to MJF at Revolution. After Castagnoli and Moxley defeated The Dark Order members John Silver and Alex Reynolds, the 3 remaining BCC members continued their assault and attacked Evil Uno and Hangman Page, thus turning the stable heel for the first time.

Members

Former members

Timeline 

Championships and accomplishments
All Elite Wrestling
 AEW World Championship (2 times) – Moxley
 AEW Interim World Championship (1 time) – Moxley
Ring of Honor
 ROH World Championship (2 times, current) – Castagnoli
 ROH Pure Championship (2 times, current) – Yuta

Notes

References

External links 
 
 
 

All Elite Wrestling teams and stables